Indotyphlops tenebrarum is a species of snake in the Typhlopidae family.

References

tenebrarum
Reptiles described in 1947